Richard Aldington (8 July 1892 – 27 July 1962), born Edward Godfree Aldington, was an English writer and poet, and an early associate of the Imagist movement. He was married to the poet Hilda Doolittle (H. D.) from 1911 to 1938. His 50-year writing career covered poetry, novels, criticism and biography. He edited The Egoist, a literary journal, and wrote for The Times Literary Supplement, Vogue, The Criterion and Poetry. His biography of Wellington (1946) won him the James Tait Black Memorial Prize. His contacts included writers T. S. Eliot, D. H. Lawrence, Ezra Pound, W. B. Yeats, Lawrence Durrell, C. P. Snow, and others. He championed Hilda Doolittle as the major poetic voice of the Imagist movement and helped her work gain international notice.

Early life and marriage
Aldington was born in Portsmouth, the eldest of four children and the son of a solicitor. Both his parents wrote and published books, and their home held a large library of European and classical literature. As well as reading, Aldington's interests at this time, all of which continued in later life, included butterfly-collecting, hiking, and learning languages – he went on to master French, Italian, Latin, and ancient Greek. He was educated at Mr. Sweetman's Seminary for Young Gentlemen, St Margaret's Bay, near Dover. His father died of heart problems at age 56.

Aldington attended Dover College, followed by the University of London. He was unable to complete his degree because of the financial circumstances of his family caused by his father's failed speculations and ensuing debt. Supported by a small allowance from his parents, he worked as a sports journalist, started publishing poetry in British journals, and gravitated towards literary circles that included poets William Butler Yeats and Walter de la Mare.

In 1911 Aldington met society hostess Brigit Patmore, with whom he had a passing affair. At the time he was described as "tall and broad-shouldered, with a fine forehead, thick longish hair of the indefinite colour blond hair turns to in adolescence, very bright blue eyes, too small a nose, and a determined mouth." Through her he met American poets Ezra Pound and Hilda Doolittle, who had previously been engaged to each other. Doolittle and Aldington grew closer and in 1913 travelled together extensively through Italy and France, just before the war. On their return to London in the summer they moved into separate flats in Churchwalk, Kensington, in West London. Doolittle lived at No. 6, Aldington at No. 8, and Pound at No. 10. In the presence of Pound and the Doolittle family, over from America for the summer, the couple married. They moved to 5 Holland Place Chambers into a flat of their own, although Pound soon moved in across the hall.

The poets were caught up in the literary ferment before the war, where new politics and ideas were passionately discussed and created in Soho tearooms and society salons. The couple bonded over their visions of new forms of poetry, feminism, and philosophy, emerging from the wake of staid Victorian mores. The couple were fed by a sense of peership and mutualism between them, rejecting hierarchies, beginning to view Pound as an intruder and interloper rather than a literary igniter.

The couple met influential American poet Amy Lowell and she introduced them to writer D. H. Lawrence in 1914, who would become a close friend and mentor to both.

Early career
Aldington's poetry was associated with the Imagist group, championing minimalist free verse with stark images, seeking to banish Victorian moralism. The group was key in the emerging Modernist movement. Ezra Pound coined the term imagistes for H. D. and Aldington (1912). Aldington's poetry forms almost one third of the Imagists' inaugural anthology Des Imagistes (1914). The movement was heavily inspired by Japanese and classical European art. Aldington shared T. E. Hulme's conviction that experimentation with traditional Japanese verse forms could provide a way forward for avant-garde literature in English.

Pound sent three of Aldington's poems to Harriet Monroe's magazine Poetry and they appeared in November 1912. She notes "Mr Richard Aldington is a young English poet, one of the "Imagistes", a group of ardent Hellenists who are pursuing interesting experiments in vers libre."She considered the poem "Choricos" to be his finest work, "one of the most beautiful death songs in the language" "a poem of studied and affected gravity".

H.D. became pregnant in August 1914, and in 1915 Aldington and H.D. relocated from their home in Holland Park near Ezra Pound to Hampstead close to D. H. Lawrence and Frieda. They felt calmer out of the bustle of the city, with more space and green. The pregnancy ended in a stillborn daughter, which traumatised the couple and put a great strain on the relationship; H.D. was 28 and Aldington 22. The outbreak of war in 1914 deeply disturbed Aldington, though no draft was in place at this time. H.D. felt more distant from the melee, not having a close affinity to the European landscape, geographical or political. This rift also put pressure on the marriage. Unhappy, Aldington dreamed of escape to America and began to have affairs. He began a relationship with Florence Fallas, who had also lost a child.

Between 1914 and 1916 Aldington was literary editor and a columnist at The Egoist. He was assistant editor with Leonard Compton-Rickett under Dora Marsden. Aldington knew Wyndham Lewis well and reviewed his work in The Egoist. He was also an associate of Ford Madox Ford's, helping him with a propaganda volume for a government commission in 1914 and taking dictation for The Good Soldier.

First World War and aftermath
Aldington joined up in June 1916 and was sent for training at Wareham in Dorset. H.D. moved to be closer to her husband. He then was sent to a camp near Manchester. They found the duality of their lives harsh, and the gruelling, regimented nature of the training felt hard for the sensitive professional poet. He felt fundamentally different from the other men, more given to intellectual pursuits than unending physical labour that left him little time to write. Their sporadic meetings were emotionally wrenching and the couple could make no plans for their future together. He encouraged H.D. to return to America where she could make a safer and more stable home. They both watched news come in of heavy troop losses in France at the Somme and on other battlefields. She could not have information given on her husband's future postings overseas, all held to be secret. Rationing and the forced draft began as the war turned against the British.

When Aldington was sent to the front in December 1916, the couple's relationship became epistolary. He wrote that he'd managed to complete 12 poems and three essays since joining up and wanted to work on producing a new book, in order to keep his mind on literature, despite his work of digging graves. He found the soldier's life degrading, living with lice, cold, mud and little sanitation. His encounters with gas on the front would affect him for the rest of his life. He was given leave in July 1917 and the couple enjoyed a reunion during this brief reprieve. He felt distant from old Imagist friends like Pound who had not undergone the tortuous life of the soldiers on the front and could not imagine the living conditions.

Aldington joined up in the 11th Leicestershires and was later commissioned as a second lieutenant in the Royal Sussex Regiment (November 1917). He finished the war as a signals officer and temporary captain, being demobilised in February 1919. He may never have completely recovered from the war, writing of his own field experiences in the collections Images of War and Images of Desire (1919), which were suffused with a new melancholy. He ended the war feeling disconsolate about his own talent as a poet. Exile and Other Poems (1923) also dealt with the process of trauma. A collection of war stories Roads to Glory, appeared in 1930. After this point he became known as a critic and biographer.

Towards the end of the war H.D. lived with composer Cecil Gray, a friend of D. H. Lawrence's. They had a daughter together in March 1919, the pregnancy much complicated by H.D.'s catching pneumonia towards the end. Neither Gray nor Aldington wanted to accept paternity. By the time of Aldington's return H.D. was involved with the female writer Bryher. H.D. and Aldington formally separated and had relationships with other people, but they didn't divorce until 1938. They remained friends for the rest of their lives. He destroyed all the couple's pre-1918 correspondence.

Aldington helped T. S. Eliot by persuading Harriet Shaw Weaver to appoint Eliot as Aldington's successor at The Egoist magazine. In 1919 he introduced Eliot to the editor Bruce Richmond of The Times Literary Supplement. Aldington was on the editorial board of Chaman Lall's London literary quarterly Coterie (published 1919–1921), accompanied by Conrad Aiken, Eliot, Lewis and Aldous Huxley. Eliot had a job in the international department of Lloyds Bank and well-meaning friends wanted him full-time writing poetry. Ezra Pound, plotting a scheme to "get Eliot out of the bank", was supported by Lady Ottoline Morrell, Leonard Woolf and Harry Norton Aldington began publishing in journals such as the Imagist The Chapbook. In reply to Eliot's The Waste Land, Aldington wrote A Fool i' the Forest (1924).

Aldington suffered a breakdown in 1925. His interest in poetry waned, and he developed an animosity towards Eliot's celebrity. Aldington grew closer to Eliot but gradually became a supporter of Vivienne Eliot in the troubled marriage. Aldington satirised her husband as "Jeremy Cibber" in Stepping Heavenward (1931). He had a relationship with writer Valentine Dobrée and a lengthy and passionate affair with Arabella Yorke, a lover since Mecklenburgh Square days, coming to an end when he went abroad.

Aldington helped Irene Rathbone publish her semi-autobiographical novel We That Were Young in 1932. They had an affair that ended in 1937. Rathbone dedicated her 1936 novel They Call it Peace to him, and she wrote a long poem, Was There a Summer?: A Narrative Poem, in 1943 about their relationship.

Exile
Aldington went into self-imposed exile in 1928. He lived in Paris for years, living with Brigit Patmore and fascinated by Nancy Cunard, whom he met in 1928. Following his divorce in 1938 he married Netta, née McCullough, previously Brigit's daughter-in-law.

Death of a Hero (1929), which Aldington called a "jazz novel," was his semi-autobiographical response to the war. He started writing it almost immediately after the armistice was declared. The novel condemned Victorian materialism as a cause of the tragedy and waste of the war. Rejectionist, an "Expressionist scream", it was commended by Lawrence Durrell as "the best war novel of the epoch". It was developed mostly while Aldington was living on the island of Port-Cros in Provence, building on the manuscript from a decade before. Opening with a letter to the playwright Halcott Glover, the book takes a satirical, cynical, and critical stance on Victorian and Edwardian cant. Published in September 1929, by Christmas it had sold more than 10,000 copies in England alone, part of a wave of war remembrances from writers such as Remarque, Sassoon, and Hemingway. The book was quickly translated into German and other European languages. In Russia the book was taken to be a wholesale attack on bourgeois politics, "the inevitable result of the life which had preceded it", as Aldington wrote. "The next one will be much worse". It was praised by Gorky as revolutionary, and the book, along with Aldington's later fiction, received huge Russian distribution. Aldington was, however, fiercely non-partisan in his politics, despite his passion for iconoclasm and feminism.

The character of George Winterbourne is loosely based on Aldington as an artist (Winterbourne a painter rather than writer), having a mistress before and through the war, and the novel portrays locations strongly resembling those he had travelled to. One of these locations, fictionally named "The Chateau de Fressin," strongly resembled a castle he wrote about in a letter to H. D.

Death of a Hero, like many other novels published around this time about the war, suffered greatly from censorship. Instead of changing or cutting parts of his novel, he replaced objectionable words with asterisks. Although they looked awkward on the page, Aldington, among others, wanted to call attention to censoring by publishers.

In 1930 Aldington published a translation of The Decameron and then the romance All Men are Enemies (1933). In 1942, having relocated to the United States with his new wife Netta, he began to write biographies, starting with Wellington: The Duke: Being an Account of the Life & Achievements of Arthur Wellesley, 1st Duke of Wellington (1943). It was followed by works on D. H. Lawrence: Portrait of a Genius, But ... (1950), Robert Louis Stevenson: Portrait of a Rebel (1957), and T. E. Lawrence: Lawrence of Arabia: A Biographical Inquiry (1955). Under financial pressure, he also worked as a Hollywood screenwriter.

Aldington's excoriating biography of T. E. Lawrence caused a scandal on its publication in 1955. In the spirit of iconoclasm, he was the first to bring public notice to Lawrence's illegitimacy and asserted that he was a homosexual, a liar, a charlatan, an "impudent mythomaniac", a "self-important egotist", a poor writer and even a bad motorcyclist. The biography dramatically coloured popular opinion of Lawrence. Foreign and War Office files concerning Lawrence's career were released during the 1960s and further biographies continued to analyse the 'British hero'. There was speculation that Aldington's spite was driven by jealousy and a sense of exclusion by the British establishment. Lawrence had attended Oxford, and his father was a baronet; Aldington suffered in the bloodbath of Europe during the First World War while Lawrence gained a heroic reputation in the Middle Eastern theatre and became an international celebrity, a homosexual icon, as Aldington saw it. Robert Graves noted in a review of the book, "instead of a carefully considered portrait of Lawrence, I find the self-portrait of a bitter, bedridden, leering, asthmatic, elderly hangman-of-letters."

Last years
Aldington lived in Sury-en-Vaux, Cher, France, from 1958. His last significant book was a biography of the Provençal poet and winner of the Nobel Prize in Literature, Frédéric Mistral (1956).

Aldington died in Sury on 27 July 1962, shortly after being honoured in Moscow on the occasion of his seventieth birthday and the publication of some of his novels in Russian translation. He was fêted in the USSR, "even if some of the fêting was probably because he had, in his writings, sometimes suggested that the England he loved could, in certain of its aspects, be less than an earthly paradise." He is buried in the local cemetery in Sury. He left one daughter, Catherine, the child of his second marriage; she died in 2010.

Legacy
On 11 November 1985 Aldington was among 16 Great War poets commemorated in stone at Westminster Abbey's Poet's Corner. The inscription on the stone is a quotation from the work of a fellow Great War poet, Wilfred Owen. It reads: "My subject is War, and the pity of War. The Poetry is in the pity."

Style and bitterness
Alec Waugh described Aldington as having been embittered by the war, but took it that he worked off his spleen in novels like The Colonel's Daughter (1931) rather than letting it poison his life. Douglas Bush describes his work as "a career of disillusioned bitterness." His novels contained thinly veiled portraits of some of his friends, including Eliot, Lawrence and Pound; the friendship not always surviving. Lyndall Gordon characterises the sketch of Eliot in Aldington's memoirs Life for Life's Sake (1941) as "snide." As a young man, he was cutting about Yeats, but they remained on good terms.

Aldington's obituary in The Times of London in 1962 described him as "[a]n angry young man of the generation before they became fashionable ... who remained something of an angry old man to the end".

Works
Images (1910–1915) (The Poetry Bookshop, London, 1915) & (historical reproduction by Bibliobazaar ) 2009
Images Old and New (Four Seas Co., Boston, 1916) & (historical reproduction by Bibliobazaar ) 2009 
The Poems of Anyte of Tegea (1916) translator
Images of Desire (Elkin Mathews, 1919) & (historical reproduction by Bibliobazaar) ) 2009
Images of War, A Book of Poems (Beaumont Press, London, 1919) & (historical reproduction by Bibliobazaar) ) 2009 
War and Love: Poems 1915–1918 (1919)
Greek Songs in the Manner of Anacreon (1919) translator
Hymen (Egoist Press, 1921) with H.D.
Medallions in Clay (1921)
The Good-Humoured Ladies: A Comedy by Carlo Goldoni (1922) translator, with Arthur Symons
Exile and Other Poems (1923)
Literary Studies and Reviews (1924) essays
Sturly, by Pierre Custot (1924) translator
The Mystery of the Nativity: Translated from the Liegeois of the XVth Century (Medici Society, 1924) translator
A Fool i' the Forest: A Phantasmagoria (1924) poem
A Book of 'Characters' from Theophrastus, Joseph Hall, Sir Thomas Overbury, Nicolas Breton, John Earle, Thomas Fuller, and Other English Authors; Jean de La Bruyère, Vauvenargues, and Other French Authors, compiled and translated by Richard Aldington, with an introduction and notes (1924)
Voltaire (1925)
French Studies and Reviews (1926)
The Love of Myrrhine and Konallis: and other prose poems (1926)
Cyrano De Bergerac, Voyages to the Moon and the Sun (1927)
D.H. Lawrence: An Indiscretion (1927) (34-page pamphlet)
Letters of Madame de Sévigné to Her Daughter and Her Friends, selected, with an introductory essay, by Richard Aldington (1927) translator
Letters of Voltaire and Frederick the Great (1927) translator
Candide and Other Romances by Voltaire (1928) translator with Norman Tealby
Collected Poems (1928)
Fifty Romance Lyric Poems (1928) translator
Hark the Herald (Hours Press, 1928)
Remy de Gourmont: Selections From All His Works Chosen and Translated by Richard Aldington (1928)
Remy de Gourmont: A Modern Man of Letters (1928)
The Treason of the Intellectuals (La Trahison des Clercs), by Julien Benda (1928) translator
Death of a Hero: A Novel (1929)
The Eaten Heart (Hours Press, 1929) poems
A Dream in the Luxembourg: A Poem (1930)
Euripides' Alcestis (1930) translator
At All Costs (William Heinemann, Ltd., 1930) 45-page story
D.H. Lawrence (1930) (43-page pamphlet; its contents are identical to D.H. Lawrence: An Indiscretion (1927), except for the dropping of the subtitle and the addition of a one-paragraph note following the title page.)
Last Straws (Hours Press, 1930)
Medallions from Anyte of Tegea, Meleager of Gadara, the Anacreontea, Latin Poets of the Renaissance (1930) translator
The Memoirs of Marmontel (1930) editor, with Brigit Patmore
Roads to Glory (1930) stories
Tales from the Decameron (1930) translator
Two Stories (Elkin Mathews, 1930): "Deserter" and "The Lads of the Village"
Letters to the Amazon, by Remy de Gourmont (1931) translator
Balls and Another Book for Suppression (1931) (13 pages)
The Colonel's Daughter: A Novel (1931)
Stepping Heavenward: A Record (1931) satire aimed at T. S. Eliot
Aurelia by Gérard de Nerval (1932) translator
Soft Answers (1932) five short novels
All Men Are Enemies: A Romance (1933)
Last Poems of D.H. Lawrence (1933) edited with Giuseppe Orioli
Poems of Richard Aldington (1934)
Women Must Work: A Novel (1934)
Artifex: Sketches and Ideas (1935) essays
D.H. Lawrence: A complete list of his works, together with a critical appreciation by Richard Aldington (1935) (22-page pamphlet)
The Spirit of Place (1935), editor, D.H. Lawrence prose anthology
Life Quest (1935) poem
Life of a Lady: A Play in Three Acts (1936) with Derek Patmore
The Crystal World (1937)
Very Heaven (1937)
Seven Against Reeves: A Comedy-Farce (1938) novel
Rejected Guest (1939) novel
W. Somerset Maugham: An Appreciation (1939)
Life for Life's Sake: A Book of Reminiscences (1941)
Poetry of the English-Speaking World (1941) anthology, editor
The Duke: Being an account of the life & achievements of Arthur Wellesley, 1st Duke of Wellington (1943). Later edition: Wellington: Being an account of the life & achievements of Arthur Wellesley, 1st Duke of Wellington (1946).
A Wreath for San Gemignano (1945) with illustrations by Netta Aldington and sonnets of Folgóre da San Gimignano titled The Garland of Months and translated by Richard Aldington
Great French Romances (1946) novels by Madame de La Fayette, Choderlos De Laclos, Abbé Prévost, Honoré de Balzac
Oscar Wilde: Selected Works (1946) editor
The Romance of Casanova: A Novel (1946)
Complete Poems (1948)
Four English Portraits, 1801–1851 (1948) (The four are the Prince Regent, the young Disraeli, Charles "Squire" Waterton, and the young Dickens.)
Selected Works of Walter Pater (1948)
Jane Austen (1948)
Decameron of Giovanni Boccaccio (two volumes) (1949) translator
The Strange Life of Charles Waterton, 1782–1865 (1949)
A Bibliography of the Works of Richard Aldington from 1915 to 1948 (1950) with Alister Kershaw
Selected Letters of D.H. Lawrence (1950) editor
The Indispensable Oscar Wilde (1950) editor
Portrait of a Genius, But . . . (The Life of D.H. Lawrence, 1885–1930) (1950)
D.H. Lawrence: An Appreciation (1950) (32-page pamphlet, which borrows from the 1927, 1930, and 1935 pamphlets on Lawrence listed above)
The Religion of Beauty: Selections from the Aesthetes (1950) anthology, editor
Ezra Pound and T. S. Eliot: A Lecture (Peacocks Press, 1954) (22 pages)
Lawrence L'imposteur: T. E. Lawrence, the legend and the man (1954) Paris edition; also published as Lawrence of Arabia: A Biographical Enquiry (1955)
Pinorman: Personal Recollections of Norman Douglas, Pino Orioli and Charles Prentice (1954)
A. E. Housman and W. B. Yeats: Two Lectures (Hurst Press, 1955)
Introduction to Mistral (1956) (biography of French poet Frédéric Mistral)
Frauds (1957)
Portrait of a Rebel: The Life and Work of Robert Louis Stevenson (1957)
The Viking Book of Poetry of the English-Speaking World, Volume II (1958) editor
"The Composite Biography as Biography," in Moore, Harry T., ed., A D.H. Lawrence Miscellany, Southern Illinois University Press (1959) and William Heinemann Ltd (1961), pp. 143-152. "[This] essay serves as the Introduction of Vol. 3 of Edward Nehls's D.H. Lawrence: A Composite Biography, copyright, 1959, by the University of Wisconsin Press...," p. 143 n.
Larousse Encyclopedia of Mythology (1960) translator with Delano Ames
Switzerland (1960)
Famous Cities of the World: Rome (1960)
A Tourist's Rome (1961)
Richard Aldington: Selected Critical Writing, 1928–1960 (1970) edited by Alister Kershaw
A Passionate Prodigality: Letters to Alan Bird from Richard Aldington, 1949–1962 (1975) edited by Miriam J. Benkovitz
Literary Lifelines: The Richard Aldington and Lawrence Durrell Correspondence (1981)
In Winter: A Poem (Typographeum Press, 1987)
Austria/L'Autriche/Österreich: A Book of Photographs, with an introduction by Richard Aldington. London: Anglo-Italian Publication, [1950-1960?]
France/La France/Frankreich: A Book of Photographs, with an introduction by Richard Aldington. London: Anglo-Italian Publications, [1950-1965?]
Italy/L'Italie/Italien: A Book of Photographs, with an introduction by Richard Aldington. London: Anglo-Italian Publications, [1958?]

References

Further reading
Richard Aldington: An Englishman (1931), by Thomas McGreevy
Richard Aldington (1938), by C.P. Snow 
Richard Aldington: An Intimate Portrait (1965), edited by Alister Kershaw and Frédéric-Jacques Temple; includes essays by Samuel Beckett, Lawrence Durrell, T.S. Eliot, Henry Miller, Sir Herbert Read, C.P. Snow, Alec Waugh, et al.
Richard Aldington 1892–1962: A Catalogue of The Frank G. Harrington Collection of Richard Aldington and Hilda H.D. Doolittle (1973)
The Poetry of Richard Aldington: A Critical Evaluation and an Anthology of Uncollected Poems (1974), by Norman T. Gates
A Checklist of the Letters of Richard Aldington (1977), edited by Norman T. Gates
Richard Aldington: Papers from the Reading Symposium (1987), edited by Lionel Kelly
Richard Aldington: A Biography (1989), by Charles Doyle. 
Richard Aldington: Reappraisals (1990), edited by Charles Doyle
Richard Aldington: An Autobiography in Letters (1992), edited by Norman T. Gates
Richard Aldington and Lawrence of Arabia: A Cautionary Tale (1998), by Fred D. Crawford. ; about the controversy generated by Aldington’s 1955 biography of Lawrence of Arabia.
Richard Aldington: Poet, Soldier and Lover 1911–1929 (2014), by Vivien Whelpton. 
The Death of a Hero: The Quest for First World War Poet Richard Aldington’s Berkshire Retreat (2016), by David Wilkinson. 
Richard Aldington: Novelist, Biographer and Exile 1930–1962 (2019), by Vivien Whelpton.

External links

Richard Aldington Papers, 1910–1962 at Southern Illinois University Carbondale, Special Collections Research Center
Richard Aldington profile and poems at Poets.org

Richard Aldington collection, Beinecke Rare Books and Manuscript library, Yale University.

1892 births
1962 deaths
Alumni of the University of London
British Army personnel of World War I
English World War I poets
20th-century English male writers
20th-century English poets
Imagists
People educated at Dover College
Writers from Portsmouth
Royal Sussex Regiment officers
Translators to English
James Tait Black Memorial Prize recipients
20th-century translators
English male poets
English male novelists
20th-century English novelists
Royal Leicestershire Regiment soldiers
Military personnel from Portsmouth
People from Ardennes (department)